Ibrahima Sory Conté (born 3 April 1996) is a Guinean international footballer who plays as a defender for French club Chamois Niortais.

Club career
Conté is a youth product of the Guinean clubs Club Industriel de Kamsar and Satellite FC. He made his professional debut for Lorient in a 1–1 Ligue 2 tie with US Quevilly-Rouen on 29 July 2017.

International career
Conté received his first callup to the senior Guinea national football team in August 2017.

Career statistics

Club

References

External links

1996 births
Living people
Sportspeople from Conakry
Association football defenders
Guinean footballers
FC Lorient players
Chamois Niortais F.C. players
Ligue 2 players
Championnat National 2 players
Guinean expatriate footballers
Guinean expatriate sportspeople in France
Expatriate footballers in France
Guinea international footballers
2021 Africa Cup of Nations players